Neil Chapman Coles, MBE (born 26 September 1934) is an English professional golfer. Coles had a successful career in European golf, winning 29 important tournaments between 1956 and 1982. After reaching 50, he won a further 14 important Seniors tournaments between 1985 and 2002, winning his final European Seniors Tour event at the age of 67. He also played in eight Ryder Cup matches between 1961 and 1977.

Early life
Coles was born in London, England, and grew up in Letchworth, Hertfordshire. He started out as a junior golfer at Letchworth Golf Club, and turned professional at 16.

Playing career
While he never became one of the leading stars of global golf, and did not win a major championship, Coles was remarkable for his consistency, and even more for his durability. He was five times a top-ten finisher in the Open Championship, finishing third in 1961 and second in 1973, although arguably his closest chances came in 1970 (when he led after a first-round 65 and was only 3 off the lead going into the final round) and 1975 (where he followed second and third rounds of 69 and 67 with a 74 at Carnoustie, when a 70 would have earned him the Claret Jug). He led the British Order of Merit in both 1963 and 1970, and maintained a top-ten position in the Merit List for almost every year of the 1960s and 1970s. He was ranked 7th in the world on the inaugural Mark McCormack's world golf rankings in December 1968, a position he regained at the end of 1970. In 1982 at the age of 48 he won the Sanyo Open in Spain and held the distinction of being the oldest winner of a European Tour event for nearly 20 years. Even at the peak of his career, he made few appearances in the United States because of his fear of flying.

Coles accumulated a 5-6-4 singles record in eight Ryder Cup appearances, tied most singles points won in the Ryder Cup history, all his appearances in a winless period of time for the Great Britain/Ireland team. He played in three Ryder Cups in the United States and went by boat to all three because of his fear of flying. During the 1967 matches at Champions Golf Club in Houston, Texas, he beat Doug Sanders on his home course twice in the same day.

Coles finished in the top ten on the European Seniors Tour's Order of Merit eight times between 1992 and 2000. Coles was the winner of the inaugural Senior British Open Championship. In 2002, during which season he turned 68, he finished eleventh. In that year he won the Lawrence Batley Seniors at the age of 67 years and 276 days, beating his own record for the oldest winner of a European Seniors Tour event, set in 2000. He also had a third-place finish in 2003. His final win tally on the Senior Tour was nine. He was inducted into the World Golf Hall of Fame in 2000.

Coles was, since its inception in the 1980s, until November 2013, the chairman of the PGA European Tour's board of directors, when he was replaced by David Williams. He is also a golf course architect designing courses such as Chartham Park.

Personal life
Coles married Ann Keep, after growing up together in Letchworth, Hertfordshire. They had two sons, Keith and Gary. Ann died in 2015. Gary was also a professional golfer and followed his father by winning the PGA Assistants' Championship in 1985, 29 years after his father.

Professional wins (50)

European Tour wins (7)

European Tour playoff record (2–1)

Great Britain and Ireland wins (19)

Continental Europe wins (3)

Other wins (9)
this list is incomplete
1962 Sunningdale Foursomes (with Ross Whitehead)
1967 Sunningdale Foursomes (with Keith Warren)
1969 Carlyon Bay Hotel Tournament
1970 Sumrie Better-Ball (with Bernard Hunt), Southern Professional Championship, Carlyon Bay Hotel Tournament
1971 Carlyon Bay Hotel Tournament
1973 Sumrie Better-Ball (with Bernard Hunt)
1980 Sunningdale Foursomes (with Doug McClelland)

Senior PGA Tour wins (1)

European Senior Tour wins (9)

European Senior Tour playoff record (2–2)

Senior Circuit wins (5)

Other senior wins (1)
1991 Léman International Senior Trophy

Results in major championships

CUT = missed the half-way cut (3rd round cut in 1972, 1983 and 1984 Open Championships)
WD = Withdrew
"T" indicates a tie for a place
Note: Coles never played in the U.S. Open or the PGA Championship.

Summary

Most consecutive cuts made – 6 (1973 Open Championship – 1978 Open Championship)
Longest streak of top-10s – 1 (five times)

Senior major championships

Wins (1)

Team appearances
Ryder Cup (representing Great Britain and Ireland): 1961, 1963, 1965, 1967, 1969, 1971, 1973, 1977
World Cup (representing England): 1963, 1968
R.T.V. International Trophy (representing England): 1967 (winners)
Double Diamond International (representing England): 1971 (winners), 1973, 1975 (captain), 1976 (winners), 1977
Marlboro Nations' Cup/Philip Morris International (representing England): 1973, 1975
Sotogrande Match/Hennessy Cognac Cup (representing Great Britain and Ireland): 1974 (winners), 1976 (winners), 1978 (winners), 1980 (winners)
Praia d'El Rey European Cup: 1998 (tie), 1999

See also
List of golfers with most European Senior Tour wins

References

External links

English male golfers
European Tour golfers
European Senior Tour golfers
World Golf Hall of Fame inductees
Ryder Cup competitors for Europe
Winners of senior major golf championships
Golf course architects
Golfers from London
Members of the Order of the British Empire
People educated at St Christopher School, Letchworth
People from Walton-on-Thames
1934 births
Living people